Linnea Johanna Svensson (born 3 February 1999) is a Swedish footballer who plays as a defender for Malmö FF in the Swedish Division 1. She has also played for the Swedish youth national teams, several times.

Honours

Club
Rosengård
 Damallsvenskan
 Winner: 2015 
 Runner-up: 2016, 2017 
 Svenska Cupen
 Winner: 2015/16, 2016/17, 2017/18
 Runner-up: 2014/15
 Svenska Supercupen
 Winner: 2015, 2016

Brøndby
Danish Women's League
 Runner-up: 2019/20

Kalmar
Elitettan
 Runner-up: 2021

Malmö
Division 2 Södra Götaland
 Winner: 2022

References

External links
 
 
 

1999 births
Living people
Swedish women's footballers
Sweden women's international footballers
Brøndby IF (women) players
Women's association football defenders
Footballers from Malmö